Railway New Colony is one of the  commercial and residential centers in Visakhapatnam, India. Railway New Colony name coming from Railway colony. Indian Railways Residential area  is located here.

Localities
Neighbouring localities include Kancharapalem, Akkayyapalem, Thatichetlapalem and Dondaparthi.

Transport
Railway New colony is well connected to Gajuwaka, NAD X Road, Gopalapatnam, Dwaraka Nagar, and Asilmetta.

Education
There are many schools and colleges located close to this suburb at Akkayyapalem and Kancharapalem.

Businesses
Sri Kanya Movie Theater and Sri Kanya Hotel are located in this community.

References

Neighbourhoods in Visakhapatnam